County Route 532 (CR 532) is a county highway in the U.S. state of New Jersey. The highway extends  from Stokes Road (CR 541) on the Medford Township-Medford Lakes border to Bryant Road (U.S. Route 9 or US 9) in Ocean Township. It runs concurrent with Route 72 from Chatsworth-Barnegat Road to Warren Grove Road (northern terminus of Ocean CR 610).

Route description

CR 532 begins at an intersection with CR 541 on the border between Medford to the north and Medford Lakes to the south in Burlington County, heading east on the municipally-maintained two-lane Tabernacle Road. The road passes through wooded residential areas, fully entering Medford Lakes before straddling the border between Medford and Medford Lakes several times. The route eventually fully enters Medford as it enters more forested areas containing residential subdivisions before coming into Tabernacle Township, where it becomes Medford Lakes Road. After crossing US 206, Burlington County maintenance begins and CR 532 continues east into more agricultural areas with a few homes, crossing CR 648. Farther east, the route becomes Chatsworth Road and heads into densely forested areas of the Pine Barrens, running along the northern edge of the Wharton State Forest. CR 532 heads away from Wharton State Forest and continues into Woodland Township, passing through more miles of forests before passing Chatsworth Lake and entering the residential community of Chatsworth. In Chatsworth, CR 532 heads south for a brief concurrency with CR 563 on Chatsworth-Green Bank Road, crossing an abandoned railroad line, before turning east onto Chatsworth-Waretown Road. The road heads northeast and east through more of the Pine Barrens before intersecting Route 72 and turning southeast to join that route.

Route 72/CR 532 enters Barnegat Township in Ocean County, where it comes to a crossroads with CR 539. From this intersection, Route 72 and CR 532 continue to a junction with CR 610, where CR 532 splits from the Route 72 by heading to the northeast on Warren Grove-Waretown Road. The route continues into Ocean Township and intersects CR 611. Farther east, the road briefly enters Lacey Township before crossing back into Ocean Township and coming to an interchange with the Garden State Parkway. After this interchange, the route continues east past forest to the north and wooded residential subdivisions to the south, becoming Wells Mills Road as CR 532 reaches its eastern terminus at US 9 in the community of Waretown. Past US 9, the road continues east as CR 612 / Bryant Road.

Major intersections

See also

References

External links

NJ State Highways: CR 531-544
Alp's Roads - CR 532

532
532
532